The Amman-Zarqa Bus Rapid Transit is a project to address the transportation issues within and between two of the biggest Jordanian cities, the capital Amman and the nearby industrial city of Zarqa. The project costs around 110 million dinars, it is currently under construction and is slated from completion in 2023.

References

Amman
Zarqa
Road transport in Jordan